Christian Aalvik was a state legislator in Washington State. He served in 1937 and his photograph was included in a montage with other Washington House of Representatives members.

He was a Democrat. He represented Klickitat County and Skamania County.

References

Year of birth missing (living people)
Living people